The 2022 BWF Para-Badminton World Championships (officially known as the HULIC DAIHATSU BWF Para Badminton World Championships 2022 for sponsorship reasons) was held from November 1 to 6, 2022. It was previously due to be held from October 25 to 31, 2021 in Tokyo, Japan. On September 9, however, BWF announced that the tournament was postponed.

Medalists

Men's events

Women's events

Mixed events

Medal table

Men's events

Men's singles WH1

Men's singles WH2

Men's singles SL3

Men's singles SL4

Men's singles SU5

Men's singles SH6

Men's doubles WH1–WH2

Men's doubles SL3–SL4

Men's doubles SU5

Men's doubles SH6

Women's events

Women's singles WH1

Women's singles WH2

Women's singles SL3

Women's singles SL4

Women's singles SU5

Women's singles SH6

Women's doubles WH1–WH2

Women's doubles SL3–SU5

Women's doubles SH6

Mixed events

Mixed doubles WH1–WH2

Mixed doubles SL3–SU5

Mixed doubles SH6

References

BWF Para-Badminton World Championships
International sports competitions hosted by Japan
Sports events postponed due to the COVID-19 pandemic
2022 in badminton
Badminton tournaments in Japan